Kim Hyun-joo (born 24 April 1977) is a South Korean actress. She is best known for her leading roles in television dramas Glass Slippers (2002), Toji, the Land (2004), Twinkle Twinkle (2011), What Happens to My Family? (2014), and I Have a Lover (2015).

Career

1996–2001: Early acting credits
Kim Hyun-joo began modeling in teen magazines when she was in third year high school. In 1996, she made her entertainment debut when she starred in the music video for Kim Hyun-chul's "One's Lifetime." Kim launched her acting career in 1997 in the television drama The Reason I Live (1997). Despite being a newcomer, she was cast in the leading role in the film If It Snows on Christmas (1998) with Park Yong-ha, followed by Calla (1999) with Song Seung-heon.

After doing a few sitcoms, Kim built her resume further by playing supporting roles on television. In 1999, She gained her first major role as she appeared in the Jang Dong-gun starrer Springtime (also known as Youth), which received low ratings. But the popular Into the Sunlight later that year boosted Kim's career. In early 2000, she appeared in episode 7 of Song Ji-na's omnibus drama Love Story, titled "Insomnia, Manual and Orange Juice." Kim then landed her first TV leading role in Virtue (Deok-yi), followed by more supporting roles in 2001 with Her House (headlined by Kim Nam-joo) and the historical drama Sangdo (based on Choi In-ho's novel about Joseon merchant Im Sang-ok).

2002–2005: Glass Slippers breakthrough
Kim achieved mainstream stardom in 2002, with her Cinderella-esque leading role in Glass Slippers, about two sisters who were separated as children and unknowingly encounter each other as adults. Also starring Kim Ji-ho, Han Jae-suk and So Ji-sub, the drama was a hit with ratings of over 30%, and Kim received acting and popularity awards at the SBS Drama Awards. Glass Slippers was also successful in China, Taiwan, Hong Kong, and Vietnam and with Kim's new pan-Asian popularity, she starred opposite Taiwanese actor/singer Vanness Wu in the martial arts movie Star Runner (2003).

For Ms. Kim's Million Dollar Quest (also known as Miss Kim's One Billion Won Project and Miss Kim's Adventures in Making a Million), she and Ji Jin-hee displayed their comedic chops as a girl left at the altar and a bankrupt playboy, respectively, who join forces in a moneymaking scheme. Kim's next role was as Lee Sung-jae's love interest in the body swapping comedy film Shinsukki Blues.

From late 2004 to 2005, Kim played the heroine Choi Seo-hee in Toji, the Land , a television adaptation of Park Kyung-ni's celebrated novel Toji ("The Land"), which portrayed the lives and loves of peasants and the nobility ("yangban") in Korea at the turn of the 20th century, spanning from Japan's colonial rule to the division of the peninsula. The big-budget production was a hit, and Kim received a Best TV Actress nomination at the 2006 Baeksang Arts Awards.

Inspired by the American TV show Joe Millionaire, Marrying a Millionaire (2005) was about an average guy (Go Soo) pretending to be rich as the concept for a dating reality show, who then genuinely falls for one of the contestants (Kim), the only girl who knows the truth. After Marrying a Millionaire, Kim went on a two-year hiatus. She later said she took a break because she hated being typecast in roles with a gentle and innocent image. But as time passed, she said she regretted her decision and should've worked harder instead to overcome her career slump.

2007–2010: Resurgence
Kim returned to television in 2007 with In-soon Is Pretty, playing the titular character who went to prison for unintentionally killing someone in high school, and after serving her time, must face prejudice as an ex-con while rebuilding her life. Despite the drama's low ratings, Kim was praised for her acting and received a Top Excellence Award at the KBS Drama Awards.

In 2009, she was cast in a small supporting role (or extended cameo) as the hero's tough-but-stylish older sister in the highly popular Boys Over Flowers, adapted from the Japanese manga Hana Yori Dango. Then in the legal drama Partner, Kim played a widow-turned-lawyer whose passionate idealism clashes with her colleague's (Lee Dong-wook) cool cynicism.

Kim then spent ten days in Vancouver, Whistler, and Victoria to film the documentary ECO Canada by Kim Hyun-joo, which aired on MBC Life. Also featured as a photo spread in Sure magazine, the shoot promoted environmental awareness by emphasizing Canada's natural backdrops, and showing Kim's green practices such as using fabric bags instead of plastic and unplugging unused electrical appliances.

Her book Hyun-joo's Handcrafted Story was published on December 20, 2009, featuring personal essays and photos about her needlework and knitting.

2010 was a difficult year for Kim, with the deaths of three of her loved ones in close succession: her friend, actor Park Yong-ha committed suicide on June 30, the production company executive who'd cast her in The Land committed suicide on July 1 because of financial difficulties, and her father Kim Tae-beom died on July 7 after a long illness. She spent the rest of the year traveling to Bangladesh and the Philippines for her volunteer work as the goodwill ambassador for Good Neighbors, a humanitarian NGO. She donated the condolence money collected for her father's funeral and a portion of her book sales to Good Neighbors, which was used to build libraries in 11 orphanages in slum areas of Dhaka. Kim said, "I literally fled to Bangladesh after a series of personal tragedies, but I was consoled by the smiles of children who are living in these dire conditions. The act of sharing has given me strength to live." She currently works as an instructor for several classes organized by Good Neighbors, teaching Korean elementary schoolchildren about poverty around the world.

2011–2015: Focusing on weekend dramas

Kim resumed her acting activities in 2011, playing the daughter from a wealthy publishing company whose life is turned upside down when she learns that she was switched at birth with another baby in Twinkle Twinkle. Her performance garnered a Top Excellence Award from the MBC Drama Awards. She also starred in Kim Dae-seung's short film Q&A, which was included in If You Were Me 5, an omnibus film commissioned by the National Human Rights Commission of Korea. Then in Dummy Mommy (2012), she played a fashion magazine editor with genius-level IQ who feels embarrassed by her developmentally disabled mother (Ha Hee-ra).

In a departure from her usual characters, Kim played one of the legendary femme fatales of the Joseon Dynasty, Lady Jo (or Jo Gwi-in), in the period drama Blooded Palace: The War of Flowers (2013). She said she was "more than delighted to have been given the opportunity to try something new," adding that, "This role will be a new life story for my acting career. I personally think it will be more interesting for an actress with an innocent image like myself to take up this wicked role." Critics praised Kim's versatility, as Lady Jo transforms from a naive young girl into an ambitious royal concubine who uses her beauty and wiles on King Injo in her thirst for power.

In early 2014, Kim began hosting Musical Journey to Yesterday, a music program in which a mix of current idol singers and industry veterans perform live hit songs from the 1970s to 1990s. Later that year, she starred in the weekend drama What Happens to My Family?, which had over 40% ratings. Her performance garnered the Top Excellence award at the KBS Drama Awards.

In 2015, she played dual roles in the melodrama, I Have a Lover. She won the Top Excellence Top Excellence Award from the APAN Star Awards and SBS Drama Awards.

2016-present: Professional expansion
Kim then starred in Fantastic, playing a drama screenwriter suffering from a terminal illness.

In 2018, she starred in the fantasy melodrama Miracle That We Met, she took the role of a tired wife, trapped in a loveless marriage. Kim described her character Sun Hye-jin as "a dormant volcano waiting to be active".

In 2019, Kim appeared in the OCN's drama Watcher. She played the role of a criminal lawyer, who was a former elite and promising prosecutor. Kim's performance earned rave review that she "created an independent and unique character that has never been seen before".

In July 2020, it was reported that Kim would starred in Undercover, a JTBC's remake of the British BBC drama of the same name. The drama saw her third reunion with her 2015 drama I Have a Lover co-star, Ji Jin-hee. Kim said of her reason for accepting the offer to join the drama:  "Last time, I received a lot of help from Ji Jin-hee for my character. This time, on the contrary, the feelings of Ji Jin-hee's character Han Jeong-hyeon need to live more. Moreover, there are many people want the two of us to reunite after I Have a Lover , so I want to return that love as well."

In the same month of 2020, Kim was confirmed joined the cast of Hellbound, a Netflix series directed by Yeon Sang-ho. She played Min Hye-jin, an attorney who stands up against religious extremists.

In October 2022, Netflix confirmed the production of its upcoming thrilled drama The Bequeathed with Kim is one of the lead roles. In December 2022, Kim starred in the SBS's drama Trolley, in which she played a wife of a member of the National Assembly

In 2023, starred in the title role in the Netflix sci-fi film Jung_E directed by Hellbound director Yeon Sang-ho. She portrayed a legendary mercenary and a subject of brain-clone testing.

Filmography

Television series

Films

Music video appearances

Variety shows

Book

Discography

Ambassadorship 
Ambassador for Busan Contents Market (2022)

Awards and nominations

References

External links 
 Kim Hyun-joo Fan Cafe at Daum 
 
 
 



South Korean television actresses
South Korean film actresses
South Korean Roman Catholics
People from Gyeonggi Province
Dankook University alumni
1977 births
Living people